Joo Ye-rim (Korean: 주예림; born on 11 October 2011) is a South Korean child actress. She began her acting career in 2018, with TV series Mistress since then, she has appeared in number of television series and films. She is known for her roles as child actor in 2019 film The House of Us as Yu Jin and family drama Mother of Mine as Jeong Da-bin. She has also appeared in Monstrum, a 2018 film.

Career
Joo Ye-rim debuted in 2018, with TV series Mistress as daughter of female protagonist, and historical drama film Monstrum portraying child Myung.

She also appeared in KBS family drama Mother of Mine as daughter of one of the female lead. For her performance she was awarded female youth acting award at the 2019 KBS Drama Awards.

In 2020, she acted as young Seo Hyun-ju in TV series Men Are Men, which got her nominated for best young actor award at 2020 KBS Drama Awards.

In 2022, she appeared in Netflix original web series The Sound of Magic as young version of female protagonist. She was also cast in film Cassiopeia as daughter of character played by Seo Hyun-jin, who is diagnosed with Alzheimer's disease and slowly turning into a young child due to loss of memory.

Filmography

Films

Television series

Web series

Awards and nominations

References

External links
 
 Joo Ye-rim on Daum 

Living people
2011 births
South Korean child actresses
21st-century South Korean actresses
South Korean film actresses
South Korean television actresses